Laphria aktis is a species of robber flies in the family Asilidae.

References

aktis
Articles created by Qbugbot
Insects described in 1919